Lleifior is the name of a fictional farm in two Welsh language novels by Islwyn Ffowc Elis.

The novels are both set in the 1950s: Cysgod y Cryman (The Shadow of the Sickle) and Yn ol i Leifior (Back to Lleifior). The first, first published in 1953, follows the Vaughan family dynasty in post war rural Powys. 

Both books have been best-sellers in Wales and have been translated into English. Cysgod y Cryman has also been issued in a Welsh learners' edition, published in 1987 by Gwasg Gomer and three times reprinted.  

Cysgod y Cryman was brought to the stage and television screen.  A stage production by Theatr Genedlaethol Cymru in 2007 was considered a critical and public success. It played to full theatres in Wales and on 5 April 2007 in the Bloomsbury Theatre in London, produced by Sion Eirian and starred Owen Garmon

Fictional farms